France competed at the 2012 Winter Youth Olympics in Innsbruck, Austria. The French team consisted of 29 athletes competing in 10 different sports.

Medalists

Alpine skiing

Boys

Girls

Team

Biathlon

Boys

Girls

Mixed

Cross country skiing

Boys

Girls

Sprint

Mixed

Figure skating

Boys

Girls

Pairs

Mixed

Freestyle skiing

Ski Cross

Ski Half-Pipe

Ice hockey

Boys

Girls

Nordic combined

Boys

Short track speed skating

Boys

Mixed

Ski jumping

Boys

Girls

Team w/Nordic Combined

Snowboarding

Boys

Girls

See also
 France at the 2012 Summer Olympics

References

2012 in French sport
Nations at the 2012 Winter Youth Olympics
France at the Youth Olympics